Schendyla nemorensis is a species of centipede in the Schendylidae family. It was first described in 1836 by German entomologist Carl Ludwig Koch.

Subspecies
 Schendyla nemorensis fountaini Turk, 1944
 Schendyla nemorensis quarnerana Verhoeff, 1937

Description
Males of this species have 37 to 41 pairs of legs, usually 39; females have 39 to 43 leg pairs, usually 39 or 41.

Distribution
The species has a principally Palearctic distribution, but has been introduced to Tasmania from Europe. The type locality is the vicinity of Regensburg in Bavaria, southern Germany.

Behaviour
The centipedes are solitary terrestrial predators that inhabit plant litter and soil.

References

 

 
nemorensis
Myriapods of Europe
Centipedes of Australia
Fauna of Tasmania
Animals described in 1837
Taxa named by Carl Ludwig Koch